Maritta Hallani (Born 1 February 1997) is a Lebanese singer composer, songwriter

Early life
Born in Beirut, Lebanon, Hallani is the daughter of the Lebanese pop singer Assi El Helani. She began her artistic career at a young age.

Discography

Singles
2016 : Yalla Nefrah
2016 : Chou Baddak
2017 : Khayfa Anam
2017 : Tla'ayna
2018 : Go
2018 : Nasini
2018 : Akher Marra

References

External links

1997 births
Living people
21st-century Lebanese women singers
Women singer-songwriters
Lebanese songwriters
Lebanese people of Iraqi descent
Lebanese Muslims
English-language singers from Lebanon